Christine Bell née Perera (born 1949), is a female former athlete who competed for England.

Athletics career
She represented England and won a bronze medal in the 100 metres hurdles, at the 1970 British Commonwealth Games in Edinburgh, Scotland.

In 1968 she became English champion over 100 m hurdles, 1968 and 1970 over 200 m hurdles and 1969 English indoor champion over 60 m hurdles. On 3 June 1967 in Blackburn she set an unofficial world-best time over 100 m hurdles with 13.7 s. In 1969 she won bronze at the European Indoor Games in Belgrade over 50 m hurdles and competed in the 1969 European Athletics Championships.

References

1949 births
Living people
English female hurdlers
Commonwealth Games medallists in athletics
Commonwealth Games bronze medallists for England
Athletes (track and field) at the 1970 British Commonwealth Games
Medallists at the 1970 British Commonwealth Games